Jesse Huta Galung was the title defender, but he lost to Pablo Cuevas already in the first round.
Kristof Vliegen became the new champion, after retired Albert Montañés in the final.

Seeds

Draw

Final four

Top half

Bottom half

References
 Main Draw
 Qualifying Draw

Siemens Open - Singles
2009 Singles